Robin McLeavy (born 19 June 1981) is an Australian actress.

Early life
McLeavy is from Sydney, Australia. She graduated from NIDA in 2004.

Career
McLeavy starred as Lola Stone in the critically acclaimed Australian horror film, The Loved Ones. The film was screened at Toronto International Film Festival in 2009 and won the Audience Choice Award. In 2009, McLeavy played the role of Stella Kowalski opposite Cate Blanchett and Joel Edgerton in the Sydney Theatre Company production of A Streetcar Named Desire. The production was directed by Liv Ullmann and toured to the Kennedy Center in Washington DC and the Brooklyn Academy of Music in New York. She received the Helen Hayes Award for Outstanding Supporting Performer. She appeared in four encore seasons of Holding the Man, an award-winning play by Tommy Murphy.

She played Isabella in Benedict Andrews's production of Measure for Measure by William Shakespeare at the Belvoir Theatre, Sydney, 5 – 25 July 2010. She appeared as Honey in Who's Afraid of Virginia Woolf?, directed by Benedict Andrews for the Belvoir Theatre Company in 2007, and for which she was nominated for Best Supporting Actress at the Sydney Theatre Awards.

Between 2011 and 2016 McLeavy played frontier tribal abductee survivor Eva Oates on the Western series Hell on Wheels. This character, including physical likeness, was inspired by the real story of Olive Oatman.

She portrayed Nancy Lincoln in Abraham Lincoln: Vampire Hunter in 2012. In 2015, McLeavy took on the role the voice of Nutsy, a Koala in Blinky Bill the Movie alongside Ryan Kwanten, Rufus Sewell, David Wenham, Toni Collette, Richard Roxburgh, Deborah Mailman, Barry Otto, and Barry Humphries on the Australian computer-animated adventure film based the book by Dorothy Wall; and she played Barbara Henning in Backtrack.

Filmography

Film

Television

Accolades
In 2012, McLeavy was nominated for the Fangoria Chainsaw Award for Best Leading Actress for The Loved Ones, but the award went to Elizabeth Olsen for Silent House.

References

External links
 

1981 births
Australian film actresses
Australian stage actresses
Australian television actresses
Living people
Actresses from Sydney
21st-century Australian actresses
Blinky Bill